In Etruscan mythology, Persipnei or Phersipnai (later Ferspnai) was the queen of the underworld and equivalent to the Greek goddess Persephone and Roman Proserpina. Persipnei was the consort of the divine ruler of the underworld, Aita. Together, both of these deities ruled the Etruscan underworld, which was guarded by Mantus and Mania. Indeed, her name was borrowed by the Etruscans from the Greeks.

See also
 Etruscan civilization

References

Etruscan goddesses
Etruscan religion
Underworld goddesses
Death goddesses